Wong Kah Woh (born 19 June 1980) is a Malaysian politician. He has served as Chairman of the Public Accounts Committee (PAC) since August 2020 and its Deputy Chairman from August 2018 to his promotion to the chairmanship two years later in August 2020. He has also served as Member of Parliament (MP) for Ipoh Timor from May 2018 to November 2022. He served as Member of the Perak State Legislative Assembly (MLA) for Canning from March 2008 to May 2018. He is a member of the Democratic Action Party (DAP), a component party of the Pakatan Harapan (PH) opposition coalition. He has served as the Political Education Director of DAP since March 2022 and the Youth Chief of DAP from November 2015 to December 2018.

Election results

References

Living people
1980 births
People from Perak
Malaysian politicians of Chinese descent

21st-century Malaysian lawyers

Democratic Action Party (Malaysia) politicians
Members of the Dewan Rakyat
Members of the 15th Malaysian Parliament
Members of the Perak State Legislative Assembly
International Islamic University Malaysia alumni
21st-century Malaysian politicians